Testard de Montigny may refer to:

 Jacques Testard de Montigny (1663–1737)
 Casimir-Amable Testard de Montigny (1787–1863), businessman and politician